Prifinium bromide is a pharmaceutical drug used primarily in the treatment of irritable bowel syndrome due to its action as an anticholinergic.

Prifinium bromide's mechanism of action is believed to be due to its activity as an antispasmodic agent.

Prifinium bromide is an antimuscarinic.

References 

Muscarinic antagonists
Quaternary ammonium compounds
Pyrrolidines
Alkene derivatives